Doğukan Sinik (born 21 January 1999) is a Turkish footballer who plays as a winger for Antalyaspor on loan from EFL Championship club Hull City and the Turkey national team.

Club career
Having spent many years in Turkey playing for his hometown club, Sinik joined Hull City for an undisclosed fee on 20 July 2022. He made his debut on 30 September 2022, when he came on as a 71st-minute substitute for Ryan Longman in the 2–0 home loss to Luton Town.

On 12 January 2023, Sinik joined Antalyaspor on loan until the end of the season.

International career
On 29 March 2022, Sinik made his debut for the Turkey national football team in a friendly against Italy. On 7 June 2022, he scored his first goal for his nation as a part of a brace against Lithuania in the 2022–23 UEFA Nations League.

Career statistics

Club

International goals
Scores and results list Turkey's goal tally first.

References

External links
 Profile at the Hull City A.F.C. website
 

1999 births
Living people
Sportspeople from Antalya
Turkish footballers
Turkey international footballers
Association football midfielders
Turkey youth international footballers
Hull City A.F.C. players
Süper Lig players
TFF First League players
TFF Third League players
Turkish expatriate footballers
Expatriate footballers in England
Turkish expatriate sportspeople in England